Glasgow Rutherglen may mean or refer to:

 Glasgow Rutherglen (UK Parliament constituency)
 Glasgow Rutherglen (Scottish Parliament constituency)